The Stanford Cardinal men's soccer team represents Stanford University in all NCAA Division I men's college soccer competitions. The Cardinal play in the Pac-12 Conference. Their first season as a varsity program was in 1973.

The Cardinal have appeared in the NCAA Division I Men's Soccer Tournament 17 times since 1973, including 14 times in the 23 seasons from 1997 to 2019. They have made five appearances in the College Cup, including winning the 2015, 2016, and 2017 national championships, only the second time ever that a program won three consecutive championships (Virginia won four from 1991 to 1994).

Roster

Coaching staff

Notable alumni

Honors 
California Intercollegiate Soccer Conference (1): 1931
Pac-12 Conference (7): 2001, 2014, 2015, 2016, 2017, 2018, 2020

References

External links 
 

 
1973 establishments in California
Association football clubs established in 1973